Vice Admiral Muhammad Fayyaz Gilani  is a retired Pakistani naval attaché and vice admiral in the Pakistan Navy and the former vice chief of the naval staff. Before assuming the office, he was serving as Chief of Staff branch Personnel, and later was assigned onboard for Washington as an attaché of Pakistan navy and now has retired from service.

Education
Gilani graduated from the Pakistan Navy War College, and later attended Pakistan National Defence University where he received naval education. He later did military operational research, gaining a master's degree from Cranfield University, in the United Kingdom.

Career
Gilani was commissioned in Pakistan navy department in 1984 with operations branch appointment. He served at various posts, including commanding officer for PNS Moawin and PNS PISHIN. He served at Commander Pakistan Fleet as a chief of staff officer and naval secretary, and later, he was promoted to staff appointments of fleets and units, including operations, projects, personnel, and training and evaluation.

Awards and decorations

References

Living people
Pakistan Naval War College alumni
Submariners
National Defence University, Pakistan alumni
Recipients of Hilal-i-Imtiaz
Place of birth missing (living people)
Date of birth missing (living people)
Pakistan Navy personnel
Alumni of Cranfield University
Pakistani naval attachés
Year of birth missing (living people)